Henry Alexander Kendall Simmons (born March 11, 1979) is a former American football guard. He was drafted by the Pittsburgh Steelers in the first round of the 2002 NFL Draft. He played college football at Auburn.

He was also a member of the New England Patriots and Buffalo Bills.

Early years
Simmons grew up in Ripley, Mississippi. He was a three-year starter at Ripley (Miss.) High, where he was named an All-State and PrepStar All-America selection as a senior defensive lineman after a season when he recorded 70 tackles and four sacks, forced five fumbles and returned one for a touchdown. Simmons was named District Defensive Most Valuable Player and was voted Clarion-Ledger "Top 10" and No. 2 offensive line prospect in Mississippi. He was a Commercial Appeal "Mid-South Top 100" and was chosen to play in the Alabama-Mississippi All-Star Game. He also played baseball and basketball.

Professional career

Pittsburgh Steelers
Before the 2003 season, Simmons was diagnosed with type 1 diabetes.

Simmons was a starter during the first two years of his career. After being injured for the entirety of the 2004 season, he returned in 2005, starting in all 20 regular and postseason games and winning Super Bowl XL with the Steelers.

Simmons experienced an off-the-field injury during the 2006 NFL season. While rehabilitating from a heel injury, Simmons suffered a frostbite-like burn to his left foot after he fell asleep with a cooling device attached to his foot.

On September 3, 2007, Simmons signed a four-year extension with the Steelers, keeping him with the club through the 2010 NFL season.

Simmons suffered a season-ending injury to his Achilles tendon during a Monday Night Football contest against the Baltimore Ravens on September 29, 2008. He was subsequently placed on injured reserve.

He was released by the Steelers on February 26, 2009.

New England Patriots
Simmons signed a three-year contract with the New England Patriots on September 6, 2009 and was released on November 6, 2009.

Buffalo Bills
Simmons was signed by the Buffalo Bills on November 24, 2009. On December 18, Simmons was placed on Injured Reserve due to a shoulder injury. He announced his retirement from football in 2011, and now lives in Auburn.

References

2. Simmons out with frostbite-like burn

External links
New England Patriots bio
Pittsburgh Steelers bio

1979 births
Living people
Players of American football from Mississippi
American football offensive guards
Auburn Tigers football players
Pittsburgh Steelers players
New England Patriots players
Buffalo Bills players
People with type 1 diabetes
People from Ripley, Mississippi
Ed Block Courage Award recipients